Shangoul And Mangoul is a 2000 Iranian animated film directed by Farkhondeh Torabi and Merteza Ahadi. Its runtime is 18 minutes and it is based on a Persian folktale.

The Big Bad Wolf takes advantage of the mother goat being out. But the kids defend themselves.

Awards
In 2000 the film won the Adult's Jury Award - Certificate of Merit for Short Film/Video - Animation at the Chicago International Children's Film Festival and in 2001 it won the Silver Poznan Goat for Best Animation Film at the Ale Kino! - International Young Audience Film Festival (Poland).

External links 
 
RealTime Arts Magazine 

2000 films
2000 animated films
Iranian animated films
Iranian animated short films
2000 short films
Iranian short films